Larkinsburg Township is one of twelve townships in Clay County, Illinois, USA.  As of the 2010 census, its population was 644 and it contained 296 housing units.

Geography

Cities, towns, villages
 Iola

Cemeteries
The township contains these eight cemeteries: Burge, Fender, Iola, Keen Chapel, Littleton, Price, Rodgers and Woods.

Major highways
  Interstate 57

Lakes
 Mc Arthur Lake
 Patterson Lake

Demographics

School districts
 Effingham Community Unit School District 40
 North Clay Community Unit School District 25
 South Central Community Unit School District 401

Political districts
 Illinois' 19th congressional district
 State House District 108
 State Senate District 54

References
 
 United States Census Bureau 2007 TIGER/Line Shapefiles
 United States National Atlas

External links
 City-Data.com
 Illinois State Archives

Townships in Clay County, Illinois
Townships in Illinois